The 2007 Mid Sussex District Council election took place on 3 May 2007 to elect members of Mid Sussex District Council in England. It was held on the same day as other local elections.

Ward results

Ardingly and Balcombe

Ashurst Wood

Bolney

Burgess Hill Dunstall

Burgess Hill Franklands

Burgess Hill Leylands

Burgess Hill Meeds

Burgess Hill St Andrews

Burgess Hill Victoria

Copthorne and Worth

Crawley Down and Turners Hill

Cuckfield

East Grinstead Ashplats

East Grinstead Baldwins

East Grinstead Herontye

East Grinstead Imberhorne

East Grinstead Town

Hassocks

References

Mid Sussex
Mid Sussex District Council elections